The Rabulist riots or Crusenstolpe riots took place in Stockholm, Sweden, in June 1838 following the Lèse-majesté conviction of the journalist Magnus Jacob Crusenstolpe. "Rabulist" was a derogatory term for political radicals in Sweden at the time. There were some calls for the abdication of King Charles XIV John of Sweden but he survived the controversy and he went on to have his silver jubilee, which was celebrated with great enthusiasm on 18 February 1843.

References

1838 in Sweden
Riots and civil disorder in Sweden
1838 riots
June 1838 events
19th century in Stockholm